Lindsay Christina Elston (born April 30, 1992) is an American soccer midfielder who played for FC Metz, the Houston Dash, and the Seattle Reign FC. She has represented the United States on the under-18 and under-20 national soccer teams. She announced her retirement in September 2017.

Early life
Elston was born McMurray, Pennsylvania to parents Ann Louise and Cassius Elston. She attended Eastlake High School in Sammamish, Washington. In 2010, she was named the 2009–2010 Gatorade Washington Girls Soccer Player of the year 

Elston played club soccer for Crossfire Premier.

University of Washington, 2010–2013
Elston played for the Washington Huskies from 2010 through 2013. In September 2012, she was named Pac-12 Player of the Week.

Playing career

Club

Seattle Sounders Women, 2012
Elston played for the Seattle Sounders Women in 2012.

Houston Dash, 2014
Elston was signed as a free agent by the Houston Dash for the 2014 season. She made her debut for the club during the season opener against the Portland Thorns FC. Elston made a total of five appearances for the club before she was waived to make room on the 20-player roster for forward Melissa Henderson. Elston had missed remarkable time with the club due to an ankle injury.

FC Metz, 2014–2015
Elston signed with French first division club FC Metz for the 2014–2015 season.  In June 2015, she helped the club win the Lorraine Cup after defeating ESAP Metz 4–0.

Seattle Reign FC, 2016–2017 
In April 2016, Elston signed with Seattle Reign FC for the 2016 National Women's Soccer League season. She announced her retirement on September 5, 2017 after being traded to the Boston Breakers.

International
Elston has represented the United States as a member of the U-18 and U-20 soccer teams

See also
List of University of Washington people

References

External links 

 Seattle Reign FC player profile
 US Soccer player profile
 Seattle Sounders Women player profile
 Washington profile

Living people
1992 births
Washington Huskies women's soccer players
American women's soccer players
Seattle Sounders Women players
USL W-League (1995–2015) players
Soccer players from Pennsylvania
Women's association football midfielders
Houston Dash players
National Women's Soccer League players
OL Reign players
Soccer players from Washington (state)
FC Metz (women) players
OL Reign draft picks